"Groovy Times" is a song by the Clash, featured on their The Cost of Living EP, and released as a promotional single in 1979 in Australia by Epic Records (AE7 1178), and also included with initial pressings of the US release of the band's debut album. It was originally recorded as "Groovy Times Are Here Again" during the recording sessions for Give 'Em Enough Rope, however this demo has never been officially released, but can be found on many Clash bootlegs. It was never performed live.

The song's lyrics are filled with images of urban decay and civil unrest and focus on recurring Clash themes of alienation, monotony and oppression. According to their author, Joe Strummer, the lyrics were sparked by his disgust at the erection of fences in Britain's football terraces, built to keep fans apart in response to football hooliganism. Ten years later the Hillsborough Disaster would prove these fences fatal and his concerns irrefutably correct. The 'King of Early Evening ITV' mentioned in the song is confirmed as Bill Grundy, whose career was ruined after his infamous interview with the Sex Pistols and was indeed presenting early evening television on British terrestrial channel ITV. "I can remember his first appearance now look what's happened to him, so they put him in a dog suit like from 1964" is about singer-songwriter Elvis Costello.

The music, acoustic and guitar based, was predominantly written by Mick Jones and feature harmonica parts by him but credited to 'Bob Jones', a pseudonym that was apparently a reference to singer/songwriter Bob Dylan.

"Groovy Times" has subsequently been re-released on the Clash on Broadway and Singles Box box sets, its single-disc equivalent The Singles and the Super Black Market Clash and The Essential Clash compilations.

Personnel

"Groovy Times"
 Joe Strummer – lead vocals, acoustic guitar, electric guitar
 Mick Jones – backing vocals, harmonica, acoustic lead guitars
 Paul Simonon – bass guitar
 Topper Headon – drums

"Gates of the West"
 Mick Jones – lead vocals, backing vocal, lead and rhythm guitars
 Joe Strummer – rhythm guitar
 Paul Simonon – bass guitar
 Topper Headon – drums

Charts

Sources

 
 

1979 singles
The Clash songs
Songs written by Joe Strummer
Songs written by Mick Jones (The Clash)
1979 songs